Human Rights Quarterly (HRQ) is a quarterly academic journal founded by Richard Pierre Claude in 1982 covering human rights. The journal is intended for scholars and policymakers and follows recent developments from both governments and non-governmental organizations. It includes research in policy analysis, book reviews, and philosophical essays. The journal is published by the Johns Hopkins University Press and the editor-in-chief is Bert B. Lockwood, Jr. (Urban Morgan Institute for Human Rights, University of Cincinnati College of Law).

According to the Journal Citation Reports, the journal has a 2014 impact factor of 0.841, ranking it 68th out of 161 journals in the category "Political Science" and 23rd out of 41 journals in the category "Social Issues".

See also 
 Universal Declaration of Human Rights
 International human rights law

References

External links 
 
 Human Rights Quarterly at Project MUSE

Human rights journals
Johns Hopkins University Press academic journals
English-language journals
Publications established in 1979
Quarterly journals